Franco Picco (born 4 October 1955) is an Italian former professional rally raid motorcyclist. He has placed three-times on the podium at the Dakar Rally and is a two-time winner of the Pharaoh's Rally. In 2015, Picco was named an FIM Legend for his motorcycle racing career.

Rally Dakar

References

External links 
 

1955 births
Living people
Dakar Rally motorcyclists
Italian motorcycle racers
Off-road motorcycle racers
Enduro riders
Sportspeople from Vicenza